Irish Rangers may refer to:
Irish Army Ranger Wing (ARW), the elite special operations forces of the Defence Forces of Ireland
Royal Irish Rangers, former infantry regiment of the British Army (1968–2002)
102nd Regiment of Foot (Irish Rangers), former infantry regiment of the British Army, raised in 1794
199th (Duchess of Connaught's Own Irish Rangers) Battalion, CEF, unit in the Canadian Expeditionary Force during the First World War
 Irish Canadian Rangers, an infantry regiment of the Non-Permanent Active Militia of the Canadian Militia

See also
Irish regiment